Hippolyte-Jules Demolière (3 August 1802 – 26 December 1877) was a 19th-century French novelist and playwright.

After he was a secretary in the French Provisional Government of 1848, he held a position within the Secretariat of the Executive under général Cavaignac.

Under the pseudonym Moléri, Demolière published, alone or in collaboration, numerous feuilletons, some of which were later published in volumes, as well as vaudevilles, Railway guides and gardening manuals.

Main publications 
Novels published in volumes
1830: L'Exposition de tableaux, ou le Faussaire (4 volumes)
1833: Le Czarewitz Constantin et Jeannette Grudzinska, ou les Jacobins polonais, with J. Czynski (2 volumes)
1837–1838: La Fille de Pauvre Jacques, with Edme Chauffer (4 volumes)
1856: Petits drames bourgeois, études de mœurs (2 volumes)
1858: Fièvres du jour : la Famille Guillaume ; l'Institutrice ; un vieux lion
1862: La Traite des blanches
1865: Or et misère
1866: L'Amour de la musique 
1867: La Terre promise
Theatre
Lébao, ou le Nègre, drame-vaudeville in 3 acts, with Chardon, Paris, Théâtre du Panthéon, 19 November 1835
Guillaume Norwood, ou Une haine de vieillards, drama in 3 acts, with Hippolyte Rimbaut, Paris, Théâtre de la Gaîté, 25 November 1838
Le Marquis de Brancas, comedy in 3 acts, mingled with songs, after a short story by M. A. de Lavergne, with Charles Henri Ladislas Laurençot and Hippolyte Rimbaut, Paris, Théâtre du Panthéon, 2 November 1839
L'Habit fait le moine, comédie-vaudeville in 1 act, with Charles Henri Ladislas Laurençot, Paris, Théâtre des Folies-Dramatiques, 22 December 1840
Le Corrégidor de Pampelune, comedy in 1 act, with Altaroche, Paris, Théâtre de l'Odéon, 23 March 1843
La Famille Renneville, drama in 3 acts and in prose, with Charles Henri Ladislas Laurençot, Paris, Second Théâtre-Français, 11 May 1843
La Jeunesse de Charles XII, comédie-vaudeville in 2 acts, Paris, Théâtre des Folies-Dramatiques, 25 July 1843
Tôt ou tard, comedy in 3 acts and in prose, with Charles Henri Ladislas Laurençot, Paris, Théâtre de l'Odéon, 6 October 1843
Le Gendre d'un millionnaire, comedy in 5 acts and in prose, with Charles Henri Ladislas Laurençot, Paris, Théâtre-Français, 25 February 1845
Un fils, s'il vous plaît, comédie-vaudeville in 1 act, with Edme Chauffer, Paris, Théâtre de la Gaîté, 28 August 1845
Entre l'arbre et l'écorce, comédie-vaudeville in 1 act, with Charles Henri Ladislas Laurençot, Paris, Théâtre du Gymnase, 30 September 1845
La Famille, comedy in 5 acts and in prose, Paris, Théâtre de l'Odéon, 3 May 1849
Un valet sans livrée, comedy in 1 act in prose, with Charles Henri Ladislas Laurençot, Paris, Théâtre de l'Odéon, 9 October 1850
La Tante Ursule, comedy in 2 acts in prose, Paris, Théâtre de l'Odéon, 26 September 1852
Les Revers de la médaille, comedy in 3 acts, in prose, with Charles Henri Ladislas Laurençot, Paris, Théâtre de l'Odéon, 24 September 1861
Varia
Itinéraire du chemin de fer de Paris à Strasbourg, comprenant les embranchements d'Épernay à Reims et de Frouard à Forbach (1853)
Guides-itinéraires. De Paris à Corbeil et à Orléans (1854)
Petit dictionnaire manuel du jardinier amateur (1865)
Petit manuel du jardinier, à l'usage des jardiniers-fleuristes, maraîchers (1873)

People of the French Second Republic
19th-century French novelists
19th-century French dramatists and playwrights
1802 births
Writers from Nantes
1877 deaths